

2023 BU is a near-Earth object that passed  from the centerpoint of Earth around 27 January 2023 00:29 UT. The asteroid is about 3–8 meters in diameter and approached Earth from the night sky.

Orbital details

The asteroid came to perihelion (closest approach to the Sun) on 27 January 2023, four hours after closest approach with Earth. 2023 BU was first imaged by Gennadiy Borisov at Nauchnyi, Crimea, on 21 January 2023 23:53 UT, about five days before closest approach. It was last observed on 31 January 2023.

The gravitational effect of the 2023 Earth approach will increase the orbital period from 359 days to an estimated 425 days. It will lift the perihelion and aphelion distances.

Impact assessment
There was no risk of an Earth impact during the 2023 Earth approach. Assuming the asteroid is at the larger size estimate of 8 meters in diameter, if it had entered the atmosphere it would not have reached the ground intact and would breakup around 30 km above the ground, thus representing only minimal threat to life. 

Impacts by objects  in diameter occur, on average, every 5 years; impacts by objects  in diameter happen, on average, once every year. 2023 BU has a 1 in 17 million chance of impacting Earth on 20 January 2110.

See also 
List of asteroid close approaches to Earth in 2023

Notes

References

External links 
 
 
 
 Archived Scout entry

Minor planet object articles (unnumbered)
20230126
20230121